Neena Modi is a British physician and Professor of Neonatal medicine at Imperial College London. She is the current president of the UK Medical Women’s Federation, and past-president of the Royal College of Paediatrics and Child Health, serving in this role from April 2015 to April 2018. She is one of only four women to ever hold this position.

Early life and education 
Modi describes herself as coming from a multicultural background. She qualified from the University of Edinburgh. She undertook specialist training in neonatal medicine at University College Hospital London, and the University of Liverpool.

Research and career 
Modi is a Professor of Neonatal Medicine at Imperial College London. She is also an Honorary Consultant in Neonatal Medicine in Chelsea and Westminster NHS Foundation Trust. Moodi advocates for child health, gender equity, and equitable access to healthcare. She has called for lowering of the voting age to 16 years, and for the UK National Health Service to be restored as a primarily publicly funded and publicly delivered healthcare service.

A practicing clinician and academic lead of a multidisciplinary neonatal research program, Modi's research interests include nutritional and other perinatal determinants of lifelong metabolic health, medical ethics, and child health. In 2007 she led the establishment of the prize-winning UK National Neonatal Research Database. She now directs this national and international resource that contains detailed information on all admissions to neonatal units in England, Wales and Scotland, for research, quality improvement, audit, and surveillance. In 2012, she established the UK Neonatal Collaborative, with the aim of developing the use of clinical electronic data to support neonatal services and research. She directs the "Neonatal Update: the Science of Newborn Care" an annual weeklong international academic meeting held in London.

Academic service 
During her career she has served, among many other roles, as President of the UK Neonatal Society (2012-15), President of the Academic Paediatrics Association of Great Britain and Ireland (2014-15), chair of the British Medical Journal Ethics Committee [3] (2009-2015), and Chair of the NHS England Infant, Children and Young People Patient Safety Expert Group (2010-2014). During her tenure as Vice President for Research at the Royal College of Paediatrics and Child Health (2009-2014), she was lead author on the RCPCH Turning the Tide report highlighting the need to strengthen child health research in the UK.

She was elected as President of the Royal College of Paediatrics and Child Health in December 2014, taking up the role on 29 April 2015. Her 3-year term ended in 2018. She is a fellow of the Royal College of Physicians (London), Royal College of Paediatrics and Child Health and Academy of Medical Sciences. She was awarded honorary fellowship of the Faculty of Pharmaceutical Medicine in 2017 and the British Association of Perinatal Medicine in 2015. In 2021 she became President of the British Medical Association.

Personal life 
Modi is married and has two children.

Publications

References 

British paediatricians
Women pediatricians
Academics of Imperial College London
Alumni of the University of Edinburgh
Year of birth missing (living people)
Place of birth missing (living people)
Living people
British women medical doctors
Presidents of the British Medical Association